Reda Aadel (born 28 December 1990) is a Moroccan cyclist. who was active from 2011 to 2017. His main strength is being a sprinter. He competed for the Moroccan cycling team Maroc Régional du Sahara in 2017. He has previously competed for the teams Al Marakeb Pro Cycling Team in 2016, Al Marakeb Cycling Team in 2015 and the Moroccan Cycling Team from 2011 to 2014.

Major results

2011
 2nd Under-23 National Road Race Championships
 6th Overall Tour d'Algérie
 8th Time trial, African Road Championships
 10th Trophée de la Maison Royale, Challenge du Prince
2012
 Challenge du Prince
1st Trophée de l'Anniversaire
3rd Trophée de la Maison Royale
 National Road Championships
4th Time trial
7th Road race
 8th Overall La Tropicale Amissa Bongo
2013
 National Road Championships
2nd Road race
8th Time trial
 Les Challenges de la Marche Verte
2nd GP Sakia El Hamra
3rd GP Al Massira
8th GP Oued Eddahab
 Challenge du Prince
8th Trophée de l'Anniversaire
10th Trophée de la Maison Royale
2014
 6th GP Al Massira, Les Challenges de la Marche Verte
2015
 Challenge des phosphates
3rd Grand Prix de Ben Guerir
5th Grand Prix Fkih Ben Saleh
10th Grand prix de Khouribga
2016
 2nd Overall Tour de Tunisie
 5th Overall Tour du Sénégal

References

Moroccan male cyclists
1990 births
Living people
21st-century Moroccan people